Qaranjik-e Khavjeh Khan (also Romanized as Qaranjīk-e Khvājeh Khān; also known as Qaranjīk) is a village in Jafarbay-ye Sharqi Rural District, Gomishan District, Torkaman County, Golestan Province, Iran. At the 2006 census, its population was 2,574, in 542 families.

References 

Populated places in Torkaman County